Remi Rough  is an artist from England.

Rough first started as a street artist in the 1980s, moving to gallery art later. His compositions are abstract with coloured shapes and straight edges.

His work has been exhibited in Hong Kong, London (United Kingdom), Los Angeles (United States), Paris (France), Perth (Australia), and Tokyo (Japan). He participated in the Dulwich Outdoor Gallery associated with Dulwich Picture Gallery, southeast London. He produced a mural in Dulwich, "Girl at a window", based on a picture by Rembrandt in Dulwich Picture Gallery.

In 2008, he spoke at Tate Modern in London in association with an exhibition on Street Art and in 2009 his book Lost Colours and Alibis was published.

Rough has worked with Jason System as "Remi Rough and System" or "Remi/Rough and System".

Gallery

References

External links
 Remi Rough website

Year of birth missing
Artists from London
Street artists
English non-fiction writers